City Stadium Štip is a multi-purpose stadium in Štip, North Macedonia.  It is mostly used for football matches and is currently the home stadium of FK Bregalnica Štip. The stadium holds 4,000 people.  It will hold maybe over 10,000 people by 2016

On 2 May 2012, for the first time in Macedonian football history, the Gradski stadium in Štip was host of the domestic cup final. In preparation for the event, the board of Bregalnica was fixed up the stadium by painting the fence, renovating the press box, locker rooms and bathrooms.

References

External links
Gradski Stadion Štip
FK Bregalnica Stip's home stadium

Football venues in North Macedonia
Multi-purpose stadiums in North Macedonia
Stadium
Štip